The Toorale State Conservation Area is a  protected conservation area located in the Far West region of New South Wales,  approximately  southwest of . The park consists of land that was previously part of Toorale Station, and is jointly managed by the NSW National Parks & Wildlife Service and the local indigenous Kurnu-Baakandji people. Mount Talowla lookout is a place with views over the floodplain.

References

State conservation areas in New South Wales
Protected areas established in 2010
2010 establishments in Australia